In enzymology, a dTDP-galactose 6-dehydrogenase is an enzyme that catalyzes the chemical reaction

dTDP-D-galactose + 2 NADP+ + H2O  dTDP-D-galacturonate + 2 NADPH + 2 H+

The 3 substrates of this enzyme are dTDP-D-galactose, NADP+, and H2O, whereas its 3 products are dTDP-D-galacturonate, NADPH, and H+.

This enzyme belongs to the family of oxidoreductases, specifically those acting on the CH-OH group of donor with NAD+ or NADP+ as acceptor. The systematic name of this enzyme class is dTDP-D-galactose:NADP+ 6-oxidoreductase. This enzyme is also called thymidine-diphosphate-galactose dehydrogenase. This enzyme participates in nucleotide sugars metabolism.

References

 

EC 1.1.1
NADPH-dependent enzymes
Enzymes of unknown structure